Bjorn Gugger (born 23 June 1980) is a South African retired soccer player who is last known to have played as a defender for Moroka Swallows.

Career

Gugger started his career with Swiss side BSC Young Boys, where he suffered injuries. In 2004, Gugger signed for Bidvest Wits in South Africa. At the age of 28, he retired due to injury.

References

External links
 

Expatriate footballers in Switzerland
1980 births
Living people
Association football defenders
South African soccer players
South African people of Swiss descent
Bidvest Wits F.C. players